The Tour du Haut-Anjou was a road bicycle race held annually in France. It was organized as a 2.2U event on the UCI Europe Tour.

Winners

References

UCI Europe Tour races
Cycle races in France
2001 establishments in France
2009 disestablishments in France
Recurring sporting events established in 2001
Recurring sporting events disestablished in 2009
Defunct cycling races in France